Clyde Browne may refer to:

 Clyde Browne (footballer) (born 1953), Guyanese footballer
 Clyde Browne (printer) (1872–1942), American printer associated with the Arroyo culture

See also
 Clyde Brown (1926–1965), Canadian politician